The DR Congo women's national basketball team represents the Democratic Republic of the Congo in international basketball competitions. It is controlled by the Basketball Federation of Democratic Republic of Congo.

The team was formerly known as the Zaire women's national basketball team.

African Championship record
1981 – 2nd
1983 – 1st
1984 – 2nd
1986 – 1st
1990 – 2nd
1993 – 4th
1994 – 1st
1997 – 2nd
2000 – 3rd
2003 – 7th
2005 – 4th
2007 – 7th
2011 – 7th
2017 – 9th
2019 – 6th

Current roster
Roster for the 2019 Women's Afrobasket.

See also
DR Congo national under-19 basketball team
DR Congo national under-17 basketball team
DR Congo national 3x3 team

References

External links
Official website 
FIBA profile
Africabasket – DR Congo Women National Team 
DR Congo Basketball Records at FIBA Archive

DR Congo
Basketball
Basketball
1963 establishments in the Republic of the Congo (Léopoldville)